A carrier system is a telecommunications system that transmits information, such as the voice signals of a telephone call and the video signals of television, by modulation of one or multiple carrier signals above the principal voice frequency or data rate.

Carrier systems typically transmit multiple channels of communication simultaneously over the shared medium using various forms of multiplexing. Prominent multiplexing methods of the carrier signal are time-division multiplexing (TDM) and frequency-division multiplexing (FDM). A cable television system is an example of frequency-division multiplexing. Many television programs are carried simultaneously on the same coaxial cable by sending each at a different frequency. Multiple layers of multiplexing may ultimately be performed upon a given input signal. For example, in the public switched telephone network, many telephone calls are sent over shared trunk lines by time-division multiplexing. For long-distance calls several of these channels may be sent over a communications satellite link by frequency-division multiplexing. At a given receiving node, specific channels may be demultiplexed individually.

History 
The purpose of carrier systems is to save money by carrying more traffic on less infrastructure.  19th century telephone systems, operating at baseband, could only carry one telephone call on each wire, hence routes with heavy traffic needed many wires.

In the 1920s, frequency-division multiplexing could carry several circuits on the same balanced wires, and by the 1930s L-carrier and similar systems carried hundreds of calls at a time on coaxial cables.

Capacity of these systems increased in the middle of the century, while in the 1950s researchers began to take seriously the possibility of saving money on the terminal equipment by using time-division multiplexing. This work led to T-carrier and similar digital systems for local use.

Due to the shorter repeater spacings required by digital systems, long-distance still used FDM until the late 1970s when optical fiber was improved to the point that digital connections became the cheapest ones for all distances, short and long. By the end of the century, analog connections between and within telephone exchanges became rare.

See also
 Channel access method

References

External links
 J-carrier

Multiplexing